Category D can refer to:

 Category D pregnancy - Positive evidence of risk
 Category D Prison
 Category D, for an International Driving Permit
 Category D village
 Category D stations (DfT)